Ivan Demchenko (born 27 September 1960, stanitsa Arkhonskaya, Prigorodny District, North Ossetia–Alania) is a Russian political figure and a deputy of the 5th, 6th, 7th, and 8th State Dumas.

Demchenko started his political career in 2002 when he was elected as a deputy of the Legislative Assembly of Krasnodar Krai from the Abinsky District. In 2006–2007, he headed the Abinsk Electric Steel Works. In 2007, he was elected deputy of the 5th State Duma from the Krasnodar krai constituency. In 2011, 2016 and 2021, he was re-elected as a deputy of the 6th, 7th State Duma and 8th State Dumas respectively.

References

1960 births
Living people
United Russia politicians
21st-century Russian politicians
Eighth convocation members of the State Duma (Russian Federation)
Seventh convocation members of the State Duma (Russian Federation)
Sixth convocation members of the State Duma (Russian Federation)
Fifth convocation members of the State Duma (Russian Federation)